Luther Francis Cole (October 25, 1925 – July 26, 2013) was a lawyer and politician from Baton Rouge, Louisiana, who served as a state legislator and then as a judge.

Cole was born in Alexandria in Rapides Parish, one of twelve children of Clement and Catherine Cole. He graduated from Bolton High School and served in the United States Navy during World War II. He attended Louisiana Tech University in Ruston and graduated from Louisiana State University Law Center in Baton Rouge. He joined a friend, Warren Mengis, in the formation of the Cole and Mengis law firm in Baton Rouge. They later partnered with Lawrence Durant.

A Democrat, Cole served in the Louisiana House of Representatives during the administration of Governor John McKeithen. His tenure extended only from 1964 until 1967, when he resigned to become a judge of the 19th Judicial District Court. From 1972 to 1973, he was president of the Louisiana District Judges Association. He subsequently served as well on the Louisiana First Circuit Court of Appeal and the Louisiana Supreme Court, Fifth District seat, to which he was elected on April 5, 1986. With nearly 62 percent of the vote, Cole defeated two opponents, Republican Patsy McDowell Cooper and fellow Democrat C. Alvin Tyler. Cole remained on the Supreme Court until his retirement in 1992; he was succeeded by Catherine D. Kimball, a former chief justice of the court.

Cole was the son of Clem and Catherine Wiley Cole. He was a Baptist. Cole and his wife, the former Juanita Barton, originally form Horatio, in Sevier County in southwestern Arkansas, had three children, Frances Harbour and husband Robert, Jeffrey Cole and wife Polly, and Christopher Warren Cole, and eight grandchildren. Graveside services were held on July 29 at Resthaven Gardens of Memory in Baton Rouge.

Son Jeffrey Cole, a Baton Rouge attorney, noted that his father never planned to serve on the state Supreme Court but ran for the post when the opportunity presented itself. Jeffrey Cole said that his father was instrumental in the establishment of a retirement system for state court judges:  "... He was not only a judge, but he was a leader and someone who helped with the entire judicial system in Louisiana. I think he was proud of being a self-made man and the things he was able to accomplish."

References

1925 births
2013 deaths
Politicians from Baton Rouge, Louisiana
Politicians from Alexandria, Louisiana
Louisiana lawyers
Bolton High School (Louisiana) alumni
Louisiana Tech University alumni
Louisiana State University Law Center alumni
Democratic Party members of the Louisiana House of Representatives
Justices of the Louisiana Supreme Court
Louisiana state court judges
United States Navy sailors
United States Navy personnel of World War II
Baptists from Louisiana
20th-century American judges
20th-century American lawyers
20th-century Baptists